Manuela Maleeva was the defending champion, but did not compete this year.

Raffaella Reggi won the title by defeating Vicki Nelson-Dunbar 6–4, 6–4 in the final. Reggi became the last Italian tennis player, male or female, on winning the tournament. No other Italian player reached the final until the 2014 edition, where Sara Errani lost against Serena Williams.

Seeds

Draw

Draw

References

External links
 Official results archive (ITF)
 Official results archive (WTA)

Italian Open - Women's Singles
1985 Italian Open (tennis)